PREPA or prepa may refer to:
 the Public Readiness and Emergency Preparedness Act
 the Puerto Rico Electric Power Authority
 Classe préparatoire aux grandes écoles, part of the French educational system

See also
 Prepa